Greene Township is one of twelve townships in Jay County, Indiana, United States. As of the 2010 census, its population was 989 and it contained 389 housing units.

History
Greene Township was organized in 1838. A large share of the early settlers being natives of Greene County, Ohio, caused the name to be selected.

Geography

Unincorporated towns
 Blaine
 Center
 Greene

Extinct towns
 Corkwell
 Pony

Adjacent townships
 Jackson Township (north)
 Wayne Township (east)
 Pike Township (southeast)
 Jefferson Township (south)
 Richland Township (southwest)
 Knox Township (west)
 Penn Township (northwest)

Cemeteries
The township contains seven cemeteries: Center, Claycomb, Kinsey, Sager, Whaley, Whicker and Whiteman.

Major highways

References
 
 United States Census Bureau cartographic boundary files

External links
 Indiana Township Association
 United Township Association of Indiana

Townships in Jay County, Indiana
Townships in Indiana